Anthony Kershler (born 6 July 1968) is an Australian cricketer. He played seven first-class and three List A matches for New South Wales between 1994/95 and 1995/96.

See also
 List of New South Wales representative cricketers

References

External links
 

1968 births
Living people
Australian cricketers
New South Wales cricketers
Cricketers from Sydney